The Central Bank of Venezuela (BCV) is the central bank of Venezuela.  It maintains a fixed exchange rate for the Venezuelan bolívar and since 1996 is the governing agent of the Venezuelan Clearing House System (including an automated clearing house).

History

Foundation and currency management
Since its inception in the late 1930s, the BCV was given a clear mandate to control the monetary policy of the nation, centralizing the operations of a handful of private banks that used to mint the Venezuelan currency, the bolívar. For almost 50 years the BCV managed to sustain a remarkable strong currency, with inflation rates hovering on the 2-3% mark during that period.

1980s oil glut

However, since the oil glut of the 1980s and the first serious devaluation of the currency in 1983 (known in Venezuela as Viernes Negro, or Black Friday) the bolívar has been plagued with chronic instability, mistrust and declining value that has been fed by the continued rise in inflation, topping an estimate for 2018 of one million per cent. Most of the foreign reserves are held as gold bars in Germany (almost 64%).

Until 2015 the Supplementary System for the Administration of Foreign Currency (SICAD) operated as an alternative foreign exchange system for businesses and individuals. Given its ineffectiveness and the continued rise of the parallel (black market) exchange rate the system was discontinued in favor of the "Complementary Currency System", known for its Spanish acronym DICOM.

2017 - Hyperinflation
Since December 2017 Venezuela the CPI has presented a behavior that fits most of the definitions for hyperinflation, the first in the country's history. The bank, subject to a strong control by the executive branch of the Venezuelan government, has ceased the publication of metrics such as the CPI and gross domestic product variation, creating a vacuum that has left investors and the public in a general state of disarray.

2019 - Sanctions 
In April 2019, the U.S. Treasury Department sanctioned the Central Bank of Venezuela "to prevent it from being used as a tool of the illegitimate Maduro regime".

Mandate
By law, the Central Bank of Venezuela is autonomous to formulate and exercise policies in its field of competence and it performs its duties and functions in coordination with the general economic policy. The Constitution grants the central bank autonomy to outline and implement the policies. However, as of 2016, reforms deemed unconstitutional by some effectively nullified the BCV's independent status.

The export, import or trade of Venezuelan or foreign currency are subject to the regulations established by the BCV, including the departure or arrival of coin and notes made by another countries by BCV's express order.

System for Transactions with Foreign Currency Securities
The Central Bank is able to issue bonds through the System for Transactions with Foreign Currency Securities (SITME). In 2012, it was reported that $44 million worth of bonds were purchased through SITME in a single day for Petróleos de Venezuela, S.A.

Presidents of the Central Bank of Venezuela

See also

 Payment system
 Real-time gross settlement
 Venezuela and the International Monetary Fund

References

Banks established in 1939
Banks of Venezuela
Government of Venezuela
Venezuela
Venezuelan companies established in 1939